Beach Volleyball at the 2015 African Games was held from September 4–14, 2015 at several venues.

Events

Medal table

Medal summary

Medal table

References

2015 African Games
African Games
Beach volleyball at the African Games